Dima Orsho (b. 1975, Damascus, Syria) is a Syrian soprano singer and composer. She studied first at the Damascus Higher Institute for Music, then at the Boston Conservatory. Since 2003, she has been a member of the Syrian Hewar ensemble, alongside Kinan Azmeh, Issam Rafea and others.

As guest artist, she has been associated with Yo-Yo Ma's Silk Road Ensemble, Tina Turner, the Morgenland Festival All Star Band or the Baroque music ensemble Musica Alta Ripa. Orsho performs in various musical styles, ranging from Arabic poetic songs or lullabies to world music and jazz-inspired scat singing. Performing with various musical groups, she has given concerts in the Middle East, Europe and the USA, among others at the Elbphilharmonie and the Barenboim-Said Academy in Germany, the Millennium Stage at the Kennedy Centre and the Library of Congress in the US, the Opéra Bastille and Théâtre de la Ville in Paris, the Bimhuis Amsterdam and the Centre for Fine Arts in Brussels.

Life and career 
In 1993 Orsho began her studies as a soprano singer and clarinet player at the Damascus Higher Institute for Music under the direction of composer Solhi al-Wadi. After her graduation, she performed with the Syrian National Symphony Orchestra at the Damascus Opera House, before moving to the United States to study classical singing at the Boston Conservatory, where she earned her master's degree in opera performance.

In Damascus, she joined Kinan Azmeh on the clarinet and Issam Rafea on the oud as well as other musicians of the world music ensemble Hewar in 2003. They have recorded three albums, including Letters to a Homeland. Further, she recorded Arabic poetry set to music by the Syrian pianist Gaswan Zerikly on their album Arabic Lieder.

In 2016, she contributed to a musical project by six singers from six different cultures and an orchestra, with a guest appearance by Tina Turner. Their album Awakening Beyond presented lyrics, prayers and lullabies performed by Regula Curti from Zurich, Switzerland, Ani Choying from Kathmandu, Nepal, Dima Orsho from Damascus, Syria/USA, Sawani Shende Sathaye from Pune, India and Mor Karbasi, from Jerusalem, Israel.

In 2017 Orsho was a guest artist on the album Sing Me Home by Yo-Yo Ma and the Silk Road Ensemble, which was named best world music album at the 59th Grammy Awards.

In 2019, she released her second solo album, with traditional lullabies from different countries as well as her own compositions, titled Hidwa - Lullabies for Troubled Times. The same year, she went on tour with the Spanish soprano Nuria Rial and the Ensemble Musica Alta Ripa and they released the album Mother: Baroque Arias and Arabic Songs.

At the annual Morgenland Festival in Osnabrück, Germany, she has appeared frequently, both as singer as well as teacher for workshops. With the Morgenland All Star Band and the Morgenland Festival Orchestra, she performed both in Germany, the Netherlands and in Lebanon. In 2015, Orsho first sang in a chamber music production of Kinan Azmeh's song cycle Songs for Days to Come in Brooklyn, New York City. At the Morgenland Festival in June 2022, Orsho appeared in the operatic version of this cycle of songs and poems of scenes based on the Syrian civil war. In a review of this premiere, her dramatic lament after an explosion at the main character’s wedding party was called "especially captivating".

At the Aix-en-Provence Festival in July 2022, Orsho sang and played the role of the prisoner Fatma in Bushra El-Turk's multi-media opera Woman at Point Zero, based on the novel by Egyptian feminist writer Nawal El Saadawi. Commenting on her different singing styles, ranging from lyrical soprano to improvised jazz techniques, her interpretation expressed the different aspects of the character and the multi-media character of this world premiere.

Orsho has also composed soundtracks for short films and feature films: Under The Ceiling (2005) was directed by Nidal Al-Debs, and the documentary movie "A Comedian in a Syrian Tragedy" (2019) about the life in exile of Syrian actor Fares Helou was directed by Rami Farah.

Discography
 Arabic Lieder, songs and compositions by Gaswan Zerikly
Hidwa. Lullabies for troubled times
Sing me home with Yo-Yo Ma and Silk Road Ensemble
Mother. Baroque arias and Arabic songs, with Nuria Rial and Musica Alta Ripa
Awakening Beyond, with Tina Turner, Ani Choying, Mor Karbasi, Sawani Shende Sathaye
with Hewar:
Hewar 2003
9 Days of Solitude 2007
Letters to a homeland 2012
with Morgenland All Star Band:

 Dastan
 Morgenland All Star Band Live in Beirut

Notable stage performances 

 Songs for Days to Come, song cycle by Kinan Azmeh (New York City 2015 and Berlin 2021; operatic version Osnabrück, 2022)
 Woman at Point Zero, opera by Bushra El-Turk, Aix-en-Provence, 2022

References

External links 

 Dima Orsho's official webpage with links to music videos
 Dima Orsho's YouTube channel
 Morgenland Chamber Orchestra & Ensemble Hewar at YouTube

21st-century Syrian women singers
Boston Conservatory at Berklee alumni
1975 births
Living people
People from Damascus
Syrian contemporary artists
Syrian musicians